Federal Highway 57D (Carretera Federal 57D) (Fed. 57D) is a tolled (cuota) part of the federal highways corridor of the paralleling Fed. 57. Eight separate tolled segments exist of Fed. 57D between Mexico City and Allende, Coahuila; a ninth is part-federal and part-state.

Roads in the Mexico City area

Chamapa-Lechería

The Autopista Chamapa-Lechería entered service in 1994. It costs 44 pesos to travel and is operated by Caminos y Puentes Federales. Combined with the Autopista Chamapa-La Venta, not part of the federal highways corridors, this highway rings the northwest and western portion of the Mexico City area.

Circuito Exterior Mexiquense

Sections of the Circuito Exterior Mexiquense, a ring road located entirely in the State of Mexico, are also designated Fed. 57D, while others are in the state highway system of the state governments of Mexico and are designated Mex 5D.

Mexico City-Querétaro

The highway between Mexico City and Querétaro is one of the oldest components of the Mexican toll road network, being the third toll highway to open in the country. It was built by Caminos Federales de Ingresos, S.A. de C.V., a state-owned predecessor to Caminos y Puentes Federales (CAPUFE), and reduced travel times between Mexico City and cities in central and northern Mexico. The road also crosses through a portion of the state of Hidalgo, including the city of Tepeji del Río.

Bypasses of San Luis Potosí

Libramiento Oriente

The two bypasses of San Luis Potosí City are identified as Fed. 57D. The Libramiento Oriente de San Luis Potosí, serving the north-south cargo traffic and also allowing traffic to access Fed. 70 to Tampico, opened on August 23, 1991. It is operated by META (Mexicana de Técnicos en Autopistas) and carries a toll of 59 pesos for cars.

Libramiento Norponiente/Poniente

 
An extension, the Western Bypass, to Fed. 80 was formally inaugurated by President Enrique Peña Nieto on February 27, 2017. The segment from Fed. 57D to Fed. 45 carries a toll of 56 pesos for cars, while the segment to Fed. 80 carries a toll of 49 pesos for cars. Both segments are maintained by META.

Libramiento de Matehuala

The  Libramiento de Matehuala opened on November 13, 2004. It is operated by OCACSA with a toll of 24 pesos for cars.

Puerto México-La Carbonera and Libramiento Oriente de Saltillo

The  Libramiento Oriente de Saltillo entered service on December 12, 1992, followed by its  southern extension to Fed. 57D near Puerto México, on the Nuevo León side of the state line, on May 1, 1994. Both roads are operated by Caminos y Puentes Federales and carry tolls of 36 and 56 pesos, respectively.

Nueva Rosita-Allende

Placed on the federal highways corridors in 2017, the Carretera Premier bypasses Fed. 57 from Nueva Rosita to Ciudad Allende in northern Coahuila. It is operated by Súper Carreteras del Norte, whose principal is known to be former governor Rogelio Montemayor Seguy, with a toll of 96 pesos for cars.

Criticism around the highway has abounded, particularly over its poor condition. Northbound travelers do not benefit from the highway's insurance policy, as they do not have toll tickets obtained at the toll booth at the northern terminus. State deputy Carolina Morales Iribarren said, "Incredibly, the free highway, 57, is in better shape." Motorists have also complained over the lack of emergency services.

References

External links

Mexican Federal Highways